Bardy may refer to:

Places
 Bardy, Poland
 Bardy-Świelubie (8th and 9th century), a Slavic-Scandinavian archaeological site in Pomerania

People with the surname
 Aleksi Bardy (born 1970), Finnish television writer, screenwriter, and film producer
 György Bárdy (1921–2013), Hungarian actor
 Julien Bardy (born 1986), French-born Portuguese rugby union player
 Pierre Bardy (born 1992), French footballer
 Pierre Bardy (politician) (born 1987), Monegasque politician
 Pierre-Martial Bardy (1797–1869), Canadian teacher, doctor, and political figure

Businesses
 Bardy Diagnostics, a supplier of medical diagnosis equipment

See also
Bardi (disambiguation)
Barty, surname and nickname
Barty, Warmian-Masurian Voivodeship, village in Poland